Patrick Tierney may refer to:

Patrick Tierney (author), American author
Patrick Tierney (Irish politician) (1904–1990), Irish Labour Party politician who represented Tipperary North
 Patrick Lennox Tierney (1914–2015), Japanologist academic in art history